Academy of Applied Arts may refer to:

 University of Applied Arts Vienna
 Academy of Applied Arts at the University of Arts in Belgrade (1948-1973)
 Academy of Applied Arts at the University of Zagreb (1950-1955)

See also
 Academy of Arts, Architecture and Design in Prague